Strip Art Features (SAF) is a comic-book publishing house and rights agent currently based in Celje, Slovenia. SAF was founded by comic book author and publisher Ervin Rustemagić in Sarajevo, Bosnia and Herzegovina in 1972. The company is known to the American public through its co-publishing arrangement with Dark Horse Comics.

SAF's magazine Strip Art was the winner of the 1984 Lucca Comics & Games  for Best Foreign Comics Publisher.

In the early 1990s, SAF had offices in the Sarajevo suburb of Ilidža as well as in Doetinchem, the Netherlands.

With the beginning of the Bosnian war in early 1992, the SAF offices in Ilidža were destroyed by a Serbian bombardment. More than 14,000 pieces of original art were lost in the flames, including pieces by Americans Hal Foster, Doug Wildey, Joe Kubert, Warren Tufts, Sergio Aragonés, George McManus, Alex Raymond, Charles M. Schulz, Mort Walker, John Prentice, Al Williamson, Gordon Bess, and Bud Sagendorf; works by Argentinean artists such as Alberto Breccia and Carlos Meglia; and pieces by European creators like André Franquin, Maurice Tillieux, Hermann, Martin Lodewijk, Philippe Bercovici, Giorgio Cavazzano, John Burns, and Ferdinando Tacconi. After escaping Bosnia and Herzegovina, Rustemagić managed to reestablish SAF in Slovenia in late 1993.

SAF holds the English-language rights to Hermann Huppen's Jeremiah. After failing to reach American audiences in the 1980s and 1990s with such publishers as Fantagraphics, Catalan Communications, and Malibu Comics; Jeremiah (and SAF) found success with Dark Horse beginning in the 2000s. SAF and Dark Horse have released other titles together as well.

See also 
 Fax from Sarajevo

References

External links
 

Publishing companies established in 1972
Publishing companies of Slovenia
Mass media in Celje
Comic book publishing companies of Bosnia and Herzegovina